Schistocerca pallens  is a large “bird grasshopper” in the subfamily Cyrtacanthacridinae that occurs throughout tropical America.  It is closely related to Schistocerca cancellata but shows no swarming behaviour or locust phase polymorphism, even under crowded laboratory conditions.  
Although not a swarming locust, it can occur at sufficiently high densities to cause economic damage. It is mainly a pest of sugar cane, but has also been recorded as damaging almond, banana, beans, breadfruit, carnauba wax palm, chickpeas, coconut palms, cotton, forage crops, groundnuts, indigo, legumes, maize, onions, rice, sorghum, sweet potato and tomatoes.

Gallery

References

External links 
 

Cyrtacanthacridinae
Orthoptera of South America